Cliff Lake may refer to:
Cliff Lake (Idaho), a glacial lake in Elmore County, Idaho
Cliff Lake (Maine), a lake in Northwest Piscataquis, Maine
Cliff Lake (Utah), a lake near Mount Powell in the Uinta Mountains, Utah
Cliff Lake (Washington), a lake in Mount Rainier National Park
Lake Cliff, a lake in Dallas, Texas
Lake Cliff, Dallas, Texas, a neighborhood in the Oak Cliff area of Dallas, Texas
Cliff Lake (ice hockey), Canadian ice hockey player

Lake, Cliff